Ukrainian defensive line was a Russian heavily fortified defensive line on the territory of modern Ukraine built between 1731–1764 on the lands of the Zaporozhian Sich and the Cossack Hetmanate. Built by imperial Russia, it strengthened the defense of the southern borders from Tatar incursions  and established military bases in approximation to the Crimea.  285 kilometers in length, it comprised 16 newly-constructed forts and 4 old forts repaired. The first stage was built from 1731–40 and subsequent construction began in the 1740s.

History of construction
Since the late 1720s, the Russian Empire began to actively prepare for war with the Ottoman Empire for the return of Azov and Northern Azov Sea Region. The Ukrainian line was built to prevent the Tatar incursion into the Poltava territory of the Hetmanate and the Kharkov territory of Sloboda Ukraine. The line proved to be of limited success given the distance between the fortresses and that the Crimean Tatars excelled in asymmetrical warfare, here by raiding through gaps in the Russian defense lines. The bulk of the work on the construction was done by Ukrainian Cossacks and peasants in 1731–1732. Every year 20 thousand Cossacks and 10 thousand peasants of Hetmanate worked on the line, who were obliged to work with their inventory and supplies, every 10th with an ox and the Cossacks with their weapons. Thousands of Ukrainians lost their lives in the construction of the line.  After signing the Treaty of Belgrade in 1739 and the transfer of the Russian-Turkish border from the territory between the Samara and Oril rivers on the Azov Sea, work on the line was terminated, and with the construction of the Dnieper line in 1770–1783, the Ukrainian line lost its military defensive value.

Structure of the Line
The line ran from the Oril river to the Siverskyi Donets River. The Ukrainian line consisted of 16 forts and 49 redoubts.

Locations

For defense there were 20 regiments of land militia, (14 cavalry regiments, and six infantry regiments) with about 22 000; it had 180 artillery guns and 39 mortars. In 1740 there were 18 forts and 140 redoubts. Bilevska castle was the center of the line. Until 1764, a land militia office was located there.

References

1730s in Ukraine
1740s in Ukraine
1750s in Ukraine
1760s in Ukraine
Forts in Ukraine
History of Dnipropetrovsk Oblast
History of Kharkiv Oblast
History of Poltava Oblast
Military of the Russian Empire
18th century in the Zaporozhian Host